HungKuo Delin University of Technology (HDUT) is a private university in Tucheng District, New Taipei, Taiwan.

HHUT offers undergraduate and graduate programs in a range of fields, including mechanical engineering, electrical engineering, computer science, business administration, visual communication design, and cultural and creative industries. 

The university has six colleges: the College of Engineering, the College of Business, the College of Design, the College of Humanities and Social Sciences, the College of Information and Communication, and the College of Law and Public Affairs.

History
HungKuo Delin University of Technology was founded in 1972 as Sze Hai College of Technology. In 1978, the HungKuo Construction and its affiliates took over the management of the college. In 1991, the school changed its name to  Sze Hai College of Technology and Commerce. In 2001, it was ungraded to De Lin Institute of Technology. In 2017, the school changed its name to  HungKuo Delin University of Technology.

Academics
 College of Engineering
 Department of Mechanical Engineering
 Department of Civil Engineering
 Department of Electronics Engineering
 Department of Computer Science and Information Engineering
 Department of Computer and Communication Engineering
 College of Management and Design
 Department of Business Administration
 Department of Applied English
 Department of Applied Foreign Languages
 Department of Real Estate Management
 Department of Spatial and Interior Design
 Department of Creative Product Design 
 College of Human Ecology
 Department of Leisure  Business Management
 Department of Hospitality Management
 Department of Culinary Arts
 Department of MICE and Tourism
 General Education Center
 Foreign Language Center

Notable alumni
 Chen Hung-chang, member of Legislative Yuan (1993–2005)

Transportation
The university is accessible within walking distance east of Tucheng Station of the Taipei Metro.

See also
 List of universities in Taiwan

References

External links
 

1972 establishments in Taiwan
Educational institutions established in 1972
Universities and colleges in New Taipei
Scientific organizations based in Taiwan
Universities and colleges in Taiwan
Technical universities and colleges in Taiwan